"Gettin' In the Way" is the first single by American R&B/Soul singer-songwriter Jill Scott, off her debut studio album on Hidden Beach label, Who Is Jill Scott? Words and Sounds Vol. 1. Released on November 11, 2000, the song was her first charting UK single, which peaked to number 30 on the UK Singles Chart and top 40 R&B singles.

Track listing
UK CD" Single

Charts

References

2000 singles
Jill Scott (singer) songs
Music videos directed by Jessy Terrero
Songs written by Vidal Davis
Song recordings produced by Dre & Vidal
Songs written by Jill Scott (singer)
Hidden Beach Recordings singles
2000 songs